The Erbacher Kopf is a hill in the Taunus range in Hesse, Germany.

External links 

Hills of Hesse
Rheingau-Taunus-Kreis
Mountains and hills of the Taunus
High Taunus
Rheingau